The Trade Chronicle is a monthly magazine published in Pakistan. It covers topics in trade, commerce, and industry. Regular features include aviation, banking, and insurance news. It has been publishing since 1953.

External links

Trade Chronicle Website

Business magazines published in Pakistan
Magazines established in 1953
Monthly magazines published in Pakistan